Khav and Mirabad Rural District is a rural district (dehestan) in Khav and Mirabad District, Marivan County, Kurdistan Province, Iran. At the 2006 census, its population was 11,849, in 2,513 families. The rural district has 32 villages.

References 

Rural Districts of Kurdistan Province
Marivan County